Samuel Eccleston, P.S.S. (June 27, 1801 – April 22, 1851) was an American prelate of the Roman Catholic Church who served as the fifth Archbishop of the Archdiocese of Baltimore, Maryland from 1834 until his death in 1851.

Biography

Early life and education
Samuel Eccleston was born near Chestertown, Maryland, to Samuel and Martha (née Hyson) Eccleston and raised Episcopalian. His grandfather, John Eccleston, was from Preston in North West England, and came to the Colony of Maryland in the middle of the 18th century. His father, who had three children from a previous marriage, died when Samuel was a young boy. Following his father's death, his widowed mother remarried a Roman Catholic gentleman surnamed Stenson. Young Samuel Eccleston was sent to St. Mary's College in Baltimore, run by the Sulpician Fathers, to be educated. There he converted to Catholicism.

Ordination and ministry
Following his conversion, Eccleston decided to enter the priesthood, and enrolled at St. Mary's Seminary in July 1819. He was ordained a priest by Archbishop Ambrose Maréchal on April 24, 1825. Later that year, he entered the Sulpicians, and continued his studies at the Grand Seminary of Saint-Sulpice in Issy-les-Moulineaux, France. After visiting England and Ireland, Eccleston returned to Baltimore in July 1827. He became a faculty member and Vice-President at his alma mater, St. Mary's Seminary, and the institution's President in 1829.

Archbishop of Baltimore
On March 4, 1834, Pope Gregory XVI appointed Eccleston Coadjutor Archbishop of Baltimore and Titular Archbishop of Thermae Basilicae. He received his episcopal consecration on the following September 14 from Archbishop James Whitfield, with Bishops Benedict Joseph Flaget, S.S., and Francis Patrick Kenrick serving as co-consecrators, in the old Baltimore Cathedral, also known as the Cathedral of the Assumption of Mary.

Upon Archbishop Whitfield's death on October 19, 1834, Eccleston succeeded him as the fifth archbishop of Baltimore. At the age of 34, he became the youngest cleric to become archbishop in the archdiocese's history. In 1835, the Holy See appointed Eccleston Apostolic Administrator of the Diocese of Richmond, Virginia, an office which he held until the appointment of Richard Vincent Whelan in 1840. Because Richmond was thus a subordinate diocese, Eccleston received the pallium, a vestment worn by metropolitan bishops, on November 1, 1835, as his predecessor had six years earlier in 1829.

Eccleston encouraged religious orders to establish houses in his diocese, particularly those who could provide social services to the growing number of Catholic immigrants in the industrializing cities. The Sisters of the Visitation increased the number of their academies in the city and archdiocese, the Brothers of St. Patrick came to direct a trade school near Baltimore, and the Redemptorists cared particularly for German-speaking immigrants. The Brothers of the Christian Schools founded Calvert Hall School, (later to become Calvert Hall College, then Calvert Hall College high school) in 1845, at the northwest corner of West Saratoga and North Charles Street, on the site of the old St. Peter's Procathedral, (first Catholic congregation in the City from 1770 to 1841). St. Charles College (a pre-seminary) was established in 1848 in Howard County, Maryland, on land donated by Charles Carroll of Carrollton, near his family estate of "Doughoregan Manor" (later moved to near Catonsille and Arbutus, Maryland in southwest Baltimore County in 1911).

With his focus on the arriving immigrants, Bishop Eccleston was less supportive of the Oblate Sisters of Providence, a religious community of African American women. Despite the lack of an appointed spiritual director from 1843 to 1847, the sisters maintained their religious practices and community life. Although the institute was approved by Pope Gregory XVI on 2 October 1831, by October 1847 Eccleston was determined to disband the community, but was dissuaded by Redemptorist Father Thaddeus Anwander, who had been directed by his superior, John Neumann to see to the sisters. At Anwander's request, he was appointed to fill the long vacant position of spiritual adviser.

Between 1837 and 1849, bishop Eccleston held five Provincial Councils of Baltimore; he even invited the exiled Pope Pius IX, (1792-1878, served 1846-1878),  to preside over the Seventh Provincial Council in 1849. Several new churches were erected during his administration as well.

Eccleston died in the Georgetown section of Washington, D.C., aged only 49. He was buried and entombed in the crypt (with predecessors and successors) of the old Baltimore Cathedral on "Cathedral Hill" in the Mount Vernon-Belvedere neighborhood north of downtown Baltimore.-

See also

 Catholic Church hierarchy
 Catholic Church in the United States
 Historical list of the Catholic bishops of the United States
 List of Catholic bishops of the United States
 Lists of patriarchs, archbishops, and bishops

References

External links
Roman Catholic Archdiocese of Baltimore

1801 births
1851 deaths
People from Chestertown, Maryland
Converts to Roman Catholicism from Anglicanism
St. Mary's Seminary and University alumni
Roman Catholic archbishops of Baltimore
19th-century Roman Catholic archbishops in the United States
Sulpician bishops
Burials at the Basilica of the National Shrine of the Assumption of the Blessed Virgin Mary